Plecia is a genus of March flies (Bibionidae) comprising many species, both extant and fossilised.

Species

Extant species 

P. acutirostris 
P. adiastola 
P. affinidecora 
P. americana 
P. amplipennis 
P. aruensis 
P. angularis 
P. avicephaliforma 
P. bicuspidata 
P. bifida 
P. bifoliolata 
P. bisulca 
P. boliviana 
P. chinensis 
P. crenula 
P. curtispina 
P. cuspidata 
P. digitiformis 
P. dileracabilis 
P. dimidiata 
P. duplicis 
P. edwardsi 
P. emeiensis 
P. erebea 
P. erebeoidea 
P. forcipiformis 
P. fulvicollis 
P. hadrosoma 
P. hamata 
P. impilosa 
P. intricata 
P. javensis 
P. lateralis 
P. lieftincki 
P. longifolia 
P. longiforceps 
P. lopesi 
P. mandibuliformis 
P. membranifera 
P. multilobata 
P. nagatomii 
P. nearctica  – Lovebug
P. obtusicornis 
P. obtusilobata 
P. oculastra 
P. okadai 
P. ornaticornis 
P. patula 
P. pellucida 
P. persimilis 
P. plagiata 
P. propeforcipata 
P. propria 
P. protea 
P. pruinosa 
P. pudica 
P. punctulata 
P. ramosa 
P. rhinigera 
P. rostellata 
P. rufangularis 
P. ruficollis  – Harlequin fly
P. rufimarginata 
P. rufiscutella 
P. rugosa 
P. serrifera 
P. spilota 
P. stricta 
P. tephra 
P. tetrascolata 
P. thulinigra 
P. trifida 
P. triquetra 
P. trunca 
P. xyele

Fossil species 
Many fossil species have been assigned to Plecia with ages dating from the Cretaceous (Campanian) through the early Pleistocene (Gelasian):

Cretaceous 
†P. myersi  (Campanian, Canadian Amber, MB)

Paleocene 
†P. undans  (Thanetian, ArdTun head, UK)

Eocene 

Ypresian, Allenby Formation, Canada

†P. angustipennis   
†P. canadensis  
†P. elatior 
†P. minutula  (Allenby Formation)
†P. nana  (Allenby Formation)
†P. pictipennis  (Allenby Formation)
†P. pulchra  (Allenby Formation)
†P. pulla  (Allenby Formation)
†P. similkameena  (Allenby Formation)
†P. transitoria  (Allenby Formation) 
†P. tulameenensis  (Allenby Formation)

Ypresian, Driftwood shales, Canada

†P. cairnesi 

Ypresian, Horsefly Shales, Canada

†P. avus   
†P. curtula  
†P. dilatata  
†P. platyptera  (Horsefly Shales)
†P. reducta  (Horsefly Shales)

Ypresian, "Mission Creek site", Canada

†P. kelownaensis 

Ypresian, Oise amber, France

†P. parisiensis 

Ypresian, Green River Formation, USA

†P. akerionana 
†P. dejecta 
†P. pealei 
†P. rhodopterina 
†P. winchesteri 
†P. woodruffi 

Priabonian, Baltic Amber

†P. borussica 
†P. brunniptera 
†P. clavifemur 
†P. hoffeinsorum 
†P. prisca 
†P. tenuicornis 

Priabonian, France

†P. angustiventris  ( Célas site, France)
†P. chapuisii  
†P. dumasi 
†P. foersteri 

Pribonian, United Kingdom

†P. acourti  (Bembridge Marls, UK)

Priabonian, Florissant Formation, USA

†P. axeliana 
†P. decapitata 
†P. explanata 
†P. gradata 
†P. melanderi 
†P. orycta 
†P. tessella

Oligocene 

Rupelian, Brunstatt, France

†P. gracillima 

Rupelian, Corent, France

†P. joannis  
†P. larteti 
†P. longipennis 
†P. pallida 
†P. rubescens 
†P. sauvagei 

Rupelian, Calcaires de Vacheres Formation, France

†P. assonensis 
†P. larguensis 
†P. maimensis 

Rupelian, Chadrat, France

†P. oustaleti 

Chattian, Niveau du gypse d'Aix, France

†P. livida 
†P. painvini 
†P. retracta 
†P. rhenana 

Chattian, Camoins-les-Bains, France

†P. theobaldi 

Chattian, Rott Formation, Germany

†P. collossea 
†P. conica 
†P. dubia 
†P. exigua 
†P. gracilenta 
†P. grossa 
†P. hypogaea 
†P. inflata 
†P. luctuosa 
†P. luteola 
†P. lygaeoides 
†P. macrocephala 
†P. morio 
†P. pennata 
†P. pinguis 
†P. proserpina  
†P. rhenana 
†P. sturmi 
†P. stygia  
†P. winnertzi

Miocene 

Aquitanian, Mexican amber, Mexico

†P. pristina 

Burdigalian, Shanwang Formation. China

†P. aculeolata 
†P. bivalvula 
†P. capitata 
†P. diatoma 
†P. fumosa 
†P. gracilentula 
†P. ludongensis 
†P. platoptera 
†P. rectivenia 
†P. solaris 
†P. spinula 
†P. villosa 
†P. vulcania 

Burdigalian, Kudia River site, Russia

†P. amagua  
†P. obsitula 
†P. kuznetzovi 
†P. kudiella 
†P. redempta 
†P. refracta 

Burdigalian - Langhian, Cypris Formation, Czech Republic

†P. quaesita 

Langhian, Chojabaru Formation, Japan

†P. kanetakii 

Serravallian, Radoboj Formation, Croatia

†P. bucklandi 

Serravallian, Oehningen beds Member (Upper Freshwater-Molasse), Germany

†P. hilaris 
†P. jucunda 
†P. macilenta 

Messinian, Monte Castellaro, Italy

†P. baglii 
†P. castellaroi 
†P. pisaurensis

Pliocene 
Piacenzian, Togo Formation, Japan

†P. intima

Pleistocene 
Gelasian, Lac Chambon, France

†P. brunneipennis 
†P. vergnei 

Revision of the Bibionidae fossil record from the Oligocene of Germany by Skartveit and Wedmann (2021) included the redescription of a number of Plecia species.
Hesperinus heeri  (formerly Plecia heeri and syn P. elegantula )

References 

Bibionidae
Nematocera genera
Taxa named by Christian Rudolph Wilhelm Wiedemann